The Zentrale Hochschulsportanlage (ZHS) is with 125.000 Students and over 17.000 active participants each semester the biggest university sports facility in Germany. The 45 ha area lies at the Olympiapark in Milbertshofen-Am Hart in Munich and could be reached by U-Bahnhof Oberwiesenfeld or U-Bahnhof Olympiazentrum. Members can use the Oberschleißheim Regatta Course for rowing.

The TUM Department of Sport and Health Sciences is located here.

See also 
 Technical University of Munich

External links 

 Site Map

Student sport in Germany
Sports venues in Munich
Milbertshofen-Am Hart